Pacogate is corruption scandal involving Carabineros de Chile, Chile's main police force. The scandal revolves around a scheme for misappropriation of public funds. Pacogate begun to be investigated in 2016 while the actions investigated occurred between 2006 and 2017.

References

Carabineros de Chile
Police corruption
Corruption in Chile